Baliosus californicus is a species of tortoise beetle or hispine in the family Chrysomelidae. It is found in Central America and North America. The Baliosus Californicus is a leaf-mining, chrysomelid beetle with adult like eating habits.

References

Further reading

 
 
 
 

Cassidinae
Beetles described in 1883